The Time of the Assassins is the debut album by The Strokes' bassist Nikolai Fraiture, released under the pseudonym Nickel Eye. It was released on Rykodisc on January 27, 2009.

Two singles were released from the album: "Brandy of the Damned", backed with album track "Back from Exile", and "Dying Star", which was released for Record Store Day 2009 and featured a remix of "Brandy of the Damned" by English musician/producer Mark Ronson. Music videos were also released for "Brandy of the Damned" and "You and Everyone Else", and an unofficial video was made for "Dying Star".

On October 14, 2008, a blog post appeared on the Nickel Eye MySpace page under the title "The Time of the Assassins". It read: 
"At the age of 19, a naive young man began a voyage down South looking to cultivate his garden in the wilderness of the American promise.  Long before the flood in New Orleans, he met a street musician called "Woof" on Jackson Square, the leader of a three-piece jazz band playing standards for tourists outside a church. The story goes that one day, as Woof sang Louis Armstrong's lyric "I see friends shaking hands", he approached the young traveler in  the crowd. Woof shook his hand and with a possessed stare put a spell on him. While still in New Orleans, a Native-American medicine woman caught sight of the young man's hands and stopped him. After observing them for a moment, she ominously warned: "To find yourself, you must first completely lose yourself".   A few nights later, while in his bed at the New Orleans Youth Hostel, there began what would be endless months of hallucinations and haunting visions: Rocky Mountain Fever.  In a burning vision, when the struggle became  too great to withstand, he saw the Phoenix rise. He had found himself at  the Crossroads and music was his only remedy. Our weary traveler shed his youthful skin and thus began the rebirth of Nickel Eye."

Track listing

Personnel 
Nikolai Fraiture: vocals, guitar, electric bass, double bass on "Where the Cold Wind Blows", harmonica on "Fountain Avenue" and "Another Sunny Afternoon"
Joel Cadbury: steel guitar  on "Providence, RI"
Jamie McDonald: additional guitar and solo on "Brandy of the Damned"
Brett Shaw: drums (all tracks except "Dying Star", "Another Sunny Afternoon", and "Hey, That's No Way to Say Goodbye")
Regina Spektor: piano on "Where the Cold Wind Blows"
Nick Zinner: guitar on "Dying Star"
Jack Dishel: backing vocals on "Intro (Everytime)" and "Dying Star"
Jesse Wallace: drums on "Dying Star" and "Another Sunny Afternoon"

References 

2009 albums
Rykodisc albums